Edawn Coughman (born July 21, 1988) is a former American football offensive tackle. He played college football at Dodge City Community College before transferring to Shaw University. He has played for the Toronto Argonauts of the Canadian Football League (CFL), and the Seattle Seahawks, Dallas Cowboys, Buffalo Bills, Tampa Bay Buccaneers, Washington Redskins and Houston Texans of the National Football League (NFL).

Early years
Coughman attended Tri-Cities High School in East Point, Georgia. He then attended Dodge City Community College.

He then transferred to Shaw University, where he played for the Shaw Bears from 2008 to 2010. He earned First-team All-CIAA honors in 2009 and 2010. Coughman was named a Division II All-American by the Heritage Sports Radio Network (HSRN) in 2009. He was also named an Honorable Mention Black College Football All-American by Boxtorow.com/BASN in 2009. He garnered Third-team Don Hansen NCAA Division II All-Super Region I recognition in 2010. Coughman earned CIAA Offensive Lineman of the Week accolades three times in 2010. He was also named to the 2010 HBUC Bowl. The Bears won the CIAA Championship in 2010. He majored in Recreation Studies at Shaw.

Professional career

Canadian Football League
Coughman played in nine games for the Toronto Argonauts during the 2011 season. He was released in May 2012.

National Football League
After being released by the Argonauts, Coughman was signed by the Seattle Seahawks on June 18, 2012. He was released in August 2012.

Coughman was signed by the Dallas Cowboys on May 13, 2013. He was released on August 30, 2013.

Three days later, Coughman was signed to the Buffalo Bills' practice squad. He was signed to a reserve/future contract by the Bills on December 30, 2013. The Bills released Coughman on August 19, 2014.

One day after being released by the Bills, Coughman was signed by the Tampa Bay Buccaneers. He was released by the Buccaneers on August 29, 2014.

On December 11, 2014, Coughman was signed to the Washington Redskins practice squad. He then signed a futures contract on December 29. He was waived by the Redskins on May 4, 2015.

On May 11, 2015, Coughman was re-signed by the Tampa Bay Buccaneers. He was released by the Buccaneers on September 5 and signed to the team's practice squad the next day. He was released by the Buccaneers on September 8, 2015.

Coughman was signed to the Houston Texans' practice squad on September 23, 2015. He was released by the Texans on October 13, 2015.

Coughman was signed by the Arizona Cardinals on January 5, 2016. He was released by the team on June 1, 2016.

Legal issues
On September 12, 2019, Coughman was arrested in Lawrenceville, Georgia and has been accused of attempting to stage a fake hate crime. Police responded to a call reporting a man damaging a restaurant and ice cream shop before fleeing in a truck with no license plates. Officers found signs of forced entry at the restaurant as well as graffiti on the walls and booths that included racial slurs, swastikas, and the phrase "MAGA." They pulled over the unmarked truck and found Coughman who they discovered owned the damaged businesses. The truck also contained multiple televisions that appeared to have been ripped off a wall.

Coughman claimed that he had noticed the damage earlier that day and had reported it to his insurance company but not law enforcement. The charges pending against Coughman include false reporting a burglary, insurance fraud, and concealing a license plate.

Since the insurance fraud incident, Coughman has also been arrested for Aggravated Assault, and Robbery. (separate incidences)

References

External links
Buffalo Bills bio
Just Sports Stats

1988 births
Living people
People from Riverdale, Georgia
People from East Point, Georgia
Sportspeople from the Atlanta metropolitan area
Players of American football from Georgia (U.S. state)
African-American players of American football
American football offensive tackles
Dodge City Conquistadors football players
Shaw Bears football players
Seattle Seahawks players
Dallas Cowboys players
Buffalo Bills players
Tampa Bay Buccaneers players
Washington Redskins players
Houston Texans players
Arizona Cardinals players
African-American players of Canadian football
Canadian football offensive linemen
Toronto Argonauts players
21st-century African-American sportspeople
20th-century African-American people